Iwachishi Dam  is a gravity dam located in Hokkaido Prefecture in Japan. The dam is used for power production. The catchment area of the dam is 644 km2. The dam impounds about 45  ha of land when full and can store 5040 thousand cubic meters of water. The construction of the dam was started on 1956 and completed in 1958.

References

Dams in Hokkaido